Rubidium perchlorate, RbClO4, is the perchlorate of rubidium. It is an oxidizing agent, as are all perchlorates.

Preparation and properties 
Rubidium perchlorate can be obtained through the careful heating of a rubidium chlorate solution, leading to a disproportionation reaction with the release of oxygen gas:

2 RbClO3 → RbClO4 + RbCl + O2

When heated, it decomposes into the chloride and oxygen:

RbClO4 → RbCl + 2 O2

It has two polymorphs. Below 279 °C, it crystallizes in orthorhombic crystal system with lattice constants a = 0.927 nm, b = 0.581 nm, c = 0.753 nm. Over 279 °C, it has a cubic structure with lattice constant a = 0.770 nm.

Table of solubility in water:

References

External links
MSDS at Science Lab

Perchlorates
Rubidium compounds